M. A. Manan (–21 September 2009) Bangladesh Awami League politician. He was elected a member of parliament from Chittagong-7 in 1973 and Chittagong-9 on 12 June 1996.

Career 
M. A. Manan was elected a member of parliament in 1973 Bangladeshi general election from Chittagong-7 as an Awami League candidate. He was elected a member of parliament in the 12 June 1996 Bangladeshi general election from Chittagong-9 as an Awami League candidate. He was defeated by participating in the national elections of the 2001 Bangladeshi general election as an Awami League candidate.

Death 
Manan died on 21 September 2009.

References 

2009 deaths
People from Chittagong District
Awami League politicians
7th Jatiya Sangsad members
1st Jatiya Sangsad members
1930s births